Kanal4 is an entertainment television channel based in Erbil, Kurdistan Region.

References

External links and references
 kanal4.net
 Frequencies
 Article on Prosave

Television stations in Kurdistan Region (Iraq)
Television stations in Iraq
Mass media in Erbil
Television channels and stations established in 2009